CFAV Firebird was a  in the Royal Canadian Navy designed by Robert Allan Ltd. Firebird was based in CFB Halifax, in Halifax, Nova Scotia. Her sister ship  is based in CFB Esquimalt.

Her three water cannons can fire water, or fire suppressant foam from her two 250 gallon tanks.

Design and construction
According to the Canadian American Strategic Review the class was designed by naval architects Robert Allan Limited, and were built at Vancouver Shipyards in North Vancouver in 1978, and later acquired by the Canadian Forces.

The ships were powered by two  azimuthing Z-drives and one hydraulic tunnel bow thruster. The ships had a crew of five firefighters.

The Fire class was equipped with three manually-controlled  water cannons, two diesel-driven fire pumps capable of expending 2,500 gpm at 150 psi each.

Operational history
On 22 March 2001 a large container vessel, Kitano, one day out of New York City, requested help fighting an onboard fire after she had gone to sea. Because of the extreme weather, Firebird was unable to leave the protected waters of Halifax Harbour to go to Kitano'''s aid; larger Navy vessels were dispatched instead.Firebird suppressed a serious fire in 's engine room in 2005. In 2008, the firefighting ship aided the Halifax Regional Fire and Emergency department in extinguishing a fire aboard a former Canadian Coast Guard ship CCGS Tupper.

In January 2014 it was announced that Firebirds time available for firefighting operations would be cut back due to budget reductions and that all operations on weekends would be suspended. It was announced that on 4 December 2014, Firebird'' was taken out of service and declared surplus.

References

Fleet of the Royal Canadian Navy
Fire-class fireboats
1978 ships
Auxiliary ships of the Royal Canadian Navy
Fireboats of Canada
Transport in Halifax, Nova Scotia